Desiderius Fernandas Sethie (born 9 December 1992) is a Namibian rugby union player for the n national team and for the  in the Currie Cup and the Rugby Challenge. His regular position is loosehead prop.

Rugby career

Sethie was born in Walvis Bay (then in South Africa, but part of modern-day Namibia).

References

External links
 

1992 births
Living people
Namibia international rugby union players
Namibian rugby union players
Rugby union players from Walvis Bay
Rugby union props
Welwitschias players